Beam Park is a planned railway station to serve the new community of Beam Park. Intended to serve a redeveloped former industrial area with extremely poor access to public transport, plans for the station have been in development since at least 2002. Beam Park is a large housing development that extends from the London Borough of Havering, where the new station is proposed to be sited, into the London Borough of Barking and Dagenham. The construction costs of the station have been met by developers in the area and the Greater London Authority. The station received planning permission in February 2019.  the Department for Transport has not authorised the introduction of passenger services at the station and is unwilling to do so until 2024.

Location
The new housing development of Beam Park extends from the London Borough of Barking and Dagenham in the west to the London Borough of Havering in the east. The station is intended to be located to the east of Marsh Way, on the Havering side. The station would have step free access to two platforms, situated between Dagenham Dock and Rainham stations on the Tilbury loop of the London, Tilbury and Southend line. The station site is on what was the  initial section of the London, Tilbury and Southend Railway that opened in 1854. The line was electrified at 25 kV AC in 1961. The proposed station building within the development is on land owned by the Greater London Authority and would be situated on Station Square. Cycle parking will be provided between the station building and the platform. The site currently has a public transport accessibility level (PTAL) rating of between 0 (no access) and 1a (extremely poor access). A Grampian condition means the housing development cannot proceed past the first phase until the station is built. The first residents moved into Beam Park in December 2020. Transport for London plan to relocate the terminus of bus routes 165 and 365 to Beam Park station.

Station planning and construction
In 2002 the London Riverside Urban Strategy proposed new stations on the Barking to Rainham railway line at Renwick Road and Beam Park (identified as CEME). The London Plan published in 2004 encouraged the development of additional stations on the rail corridor. Havering Council identified the potential for a new station, by now called Beam Park, in 2008. Havering Council became promoter of the station in 2012. The council submitted a successful bid to the Greater London Authority in 2014 for "Rainham and Beam Park" to become a housing zone, including delivery of the station. In 2014 the station was included in the London Infrastructure Plan 2050 produced by the Greater London Authority, with an expected completion date of 2020 and a capital cost of £15 million. 

In December 2016 £9.6 million was awarded by the Greater London Authority to Havering Council to deliver the station. The station was added to Havering Council's local plan in 2016, with the intention of it being the focus of a new local centre. In 2017 it was expected that station construction would be complete in time for the December 2020 timetable recast. The Greater London Authority took over responsibility for promotion of the station from Havering Council in November 2018. In March 2019 Countryside agreed to provide a station building to a shell and core specification to a design by JSA Architects. Planning consent was issued in February 2019. Building work was expected to take place from December 2020. The new station was expected to open in May 2022. The Greater London Authority submitted a bid for £9.1 million to the Levelling Up Fund in May 2021 to support the construction of the station.

Provision of passenger services
In February 2012 the Department for Transport began the process of renewing the Essex Thameside rail franchise by issuing a consultation to stakeholders. In July 2012 the responses to the consultation were published. Barking and Dagenham Council and Havering Council made representations about the provision of a new station at Beam Park and evidence was provided by Transport for London about the business case for the new station. 

The Department for Transport asked bidders responding to the July 2012 invitation to tender for the Essex Thameside franchise to prepare priced plans for the introduction of passenger train services at a new station at Beam Park, that could happen at any time during the period of the franchise. Bids were returned at the end of September 2012. However, the process was paused and then restarted in 2013 with a new invitation to tender issued. The draft franchise agreement contained provisions for the introduction of the station at Beam Park during the period of the franchise. 

In June 2014 the franchise to run passenger services on the line from 9 November 2014 to 10 November 2029 was awarded by the Department for Transport to National Express, with the service operated under the existing c2c brand. The signed franchise agreement contained the provisions for services at Beam Park. National Express sold the franchise to Trenitalia in 2017. Trenitalia/c2c were expecting work on the new station to start in 2018 and to take two years to complete. In July 2021 the franchise agreement was replaced with a rail contract that also makes provision for a new station at Beam Park.

The plans for the station were thrown into doubt in October 2021 when the Department for Transport claimed there was never any government support for the station and it would not authorise the commencement of passenger services. It was later revealed that the Department for Transport had concerns the station would not have enough passengers to be viable and would attract passengers from the adjacent stations at Rainham and Dagenham Dock, despite the extensive house building in the area. The provision of the station requires an additional train and this was not taken into account. The Greater London Authority provided a ten year indemnity to protect the Department for Transport against any operational losses. 

In December 2022 the rail operator Trenitalia indicted it would need until May 2023 to study the likely impact of proposals for the station. The leader of Havering Council hoped that the station could open by 2025 with government intervention. In January 2023 the Department for Transport indicated that approval for the station was unlikely to happen before early 2024.

Services
The current off-peak passenger service through the site is two trains per hour in each direction between Fenchurch Street and Grays and four trains per hour at peak times. Services are provided by Trenitalia using the c2c brand.

References

Proposed railway stations in London
Railway stations in the London Borough of Havering